Citromicrobium is an aerobic bacteria genus from the family of Sphingomonadaceae with one known species (Citromicrobium bathyomarinum).

References

Further reading 
 

Sphingomonadales
Bacteria genera
Monotypic bacteria genera
Taxa described in 1999